The 2021 A Lyga, for sponsorship reasons also called Optibet A lyga is the 32nd season of the A Lyga, the top-tier football league of Lithuania. The season began on 5 March and concluded on 28 November 2021.

Teams
FK Žalgiris started the season as defending champions. None of the 6 last year's teams were relegated, and 4 teams were promoted to A lyga.

Licensing process
In addition to sporting principles of promotion and relegation, the teams and clubs need to pass rigorous licensing process. Because of this, promotion and relegation does not always follow the rights achieved by sporting principle. A total of 12 teams applied for A lyga license:

The 6 previous season's teams:
 FK Žalgiris, FK Sūduva Marijampolė, FK Kauno Žalgiris, FK Panevėžys, FK Banga Gargždai and FK Riteriai met licensing criteria and received a straight pass to their licenses. 

Top 4 2020 LFF I Lyga teams:
 FK „Nevėžis“ (Kėdainiai), FC „Hegelmann Litauen“ (Kaunas), FK „Jonava“ (Jonava), FC „Džiugas“ (Telšiai) have all applied. FK Nevėžis and FC Hegelmann Litauen got their licenses straight away. FC Džiugas has been granted a license after an appeal. FK Jonava failed to meet all licensing criteria and were not issued a license. The club appealed, the appeal was rejected, then the club requested participation by exception — a method used by Lithuanian Football Federation to make up numbers in the league after licensing fails. The request was also rejected by LFF council's vote in favour to 6th placed DFK Dainava. 

Other 2020 LFF I Lyga teams:
 FA „Šiauliai“ (Šiauliai), DFK „Dainava“ (Alytus). FA Šiauliai later withdrew from licensing process, claiming that the team is not yet ready for top division football. DFK Dainava failed licensing criteria, however after FK Jonava's failure to meet licensing criteria, DFK Dainava were invited to request participation by exception, and were ultimately promoted to the A lyga.

The controversial decision to drop FK Jonava and promote DFK Dainava was justified by the fact that FK Jonava have pending investigation to allegations of match fixing in the 2020 season. The LFF have issued sanctions and fines against three players and the club, however FK Jonava deny allegations of involvement in match fixing in the three matches that are being investigated and have appealed. The LFF have also revealed that a warning letter has been issued to FK Jonava in relation to the team's coach, who has been reportedly involved in match fixing in his previous career.

Changes
FK Nevėžis (Kėdainiai), FC Hegelmann Litauen (Kaunas), FC Džiugas (Telšiai) and DFK Dainava (Alytus), the latter three teams promoted to the top-flight for the first time in their history, were promoted from the 2020 LFF I Lyga.

2021 competitors

Personnel

Managerial changes

Effects of the COVID-19 pandemic 
As soon as 2020 A Lyga season has completed, on 7 November 2020 COVID-19 quarantine was reintroduced in Lithuania, and extended several times. At the beginning of February, at the time LFF were building fixtures calendar, the quarantine was set to last until 28 February.

It is expected that at the beginning of the championship the matches will take place without spectators. Under the government's proposal, the matches can be attended by 100 spectators when the rate of COVID-19 infections per 100,000 inhabitants in 14 day period will drop below 50. The matches can be attended by 200 spectators when COVID-19 cases will drop below 25. On 4 February infection rate was 395.3.

Approaching the start date of the championship, scheduled for 5 March 2021, the clubs performed mandatory COVID-19 testing. Three clubs have reported infections among the players and their fixtures have been postponed. FK Žalgiris reported 7 positive cases of COVID-19, FK Panevėžys - 6, FK Riteriai initially did not reveal the number, but it was later revealed that 19 players and staff were tested positive.

Regular season
The season has kicked off as scheduled on 5 March. Each team will play four matches with all other teams this season.

League table

Fixtures and results

Rounds 1–18

Rounds 19–36

Statistics

Top goalscorers

See also
 2021 LFF I Lyga
 Football in Lithuania
 2021 Lithuanian Football Cup

References

External links
 

LFF Lyga seasons
2021 in Lithuanian football